{{DISPLAYTITLE:74 knot}}

In mathematical knot theory, 74 is the name of a 7-crossing knot which can be visually depicted in a highly-symmetric form, and so appears in the symbolism and/or artistic ornamentation of various cultures.

Visual representations

The interlaced version of the simplest form of the Endless knot symbol of Buddhism is topologically  equivalent to the 74 knot (though it appears to have nine crossings), as is the interlaced version of the unicursal hexagram of occultism.  (However, the endless knot symbol has more complex forms not equivalent to 74, and both the endless knot and unicursal hexagram can appear in non-interlaced versions, in which case they are not knots at all.)

Example

Sources

Double torus knots and links